The 1995 North Atlantic Conference baseball tournament was held at Frawley Stadium in Wilmington, Delaware. The top six regular season finishers of the league's nine teams qualified for the double-elimination tournament. In the championship game, first-seeded Delaware defeated fifth-seeded Drexel, 12-2, to win its first tournament championship. As a result, Delaware received the North Atlantic's automatic bid to the 1995 NCAA Tournament play-in round.

Seeding 
The top six finishers from the regular season were seeded one through six based on conference winning percentage only. They then played in a double-elimination format. In the first round, the one and six seeds were matched up in the first game, the two and five seeds in the second, and the three and four seeds in the third.

Results

All-Tournament Team 
The following players were named to the All-Tournament Team.

Most Outstanding Player 
Drexel pitcher and infielder Kris Doiron was named Most Outstanding Player.

Notes

References 

America East Conference Baseball Tournament
1995 North Atlantic Conference baseball season
Sports competitions in Wilmington, Delaware
1995 in sports in Delaware
College baseball tournaments in Delaware